Palembangese may refer to:

 Palembangese people
 Palembangese language
 Palembangese cuisine

See also
 Palembang

Language and nationality disambiguation pages